The Troy Junction–Merrygoen railway line is a railway line in northern New South Wales, Australia. It forms part of a cross country railway line between Dubbo in the state's Central West, and Werris Creek on the Main North line, allowing goods from the west of the state to access the Hunter ports, bypassing Sydney.

This section of line is likely to form part of the Inland Railway from Melbourne to Brisbane.

Junction 

At Troy Junction in Dubbo the railway line to Merrygoen branches off the line to Coonamble.

At Merrygoen, the line joins the Gwabegar railway line.

Stations 

 Troy Junction
 Boothenba (abandoned)
 Beni (abandoned)
 Barbigal, New South Wales (abandoned)
 Ballimore (abandoned)
 Muronbung, New South Wales (abandoned)
 Elong Elong (crossing loop, silo)
 Boomley (abandoned)
 Mendooran (silo)
 Merrygoen

See also 
 Rail transport in New South Wales

References 

Regional railway lines in New South Wales
Standard gauge railways in Australia